Luc Giard (1956) is a Canadian underground cartoonist and artist. Giard is mostly known for his bold, intense drawings of fat Tintin reproductions, nudes, cars and portraits.

Biography

Bibliography
 Konoshiko, (Impressions Nouvelles, 2012)
 Le pont du Havre, (Mécanique générale, 2005)
 A Village Under My Pillow, (Drawn & Quarterly, 2005)
 Les nouvelles aventures de Ticoune ze Whiz Tornado: Donut Death, (Mécanique générale, 2005)
 Ticoune ze Whiz Tornado 07, (Colosse, 2003)
 Ticoune ze Whiz Tornado 06, (Colosse, 2003)
 Les aventures de monsieur Luc Giard, (Mécanique générale, 2002)
 La guerre, (Colosse, 2002)
 Un pull crado pour une crapule, (Ticoune, 1999)
 Les p'tits Tintins à Luc Giard, (Jour de fête, 1997)
 Portraits, (Zone Convective,  1996)
 Vers le pays des morts (with Grégoire Bouchard), (Phylactère, 1991)
 Ticoune ze whiz tornado no 1 à 5, (Phylactère, 1989–1990)
 Tintin et son ti-gars, (Phylactère, 1989)
 Cartoons, (Phylactère, 1988)
 Kesskiss passe Milou ?, (Phylactère, 1988)
 Ze British barbu, (Ticoune, 1988)
 Tintin chez Krazy Kat, (Ticoune, 1988)
 Tintin et sa Dinky toys, (Ticoune, 1987)
 La Torpado noire, (Ticoune, 1987)
 Batman portfolio, (Ticoune, 1987)
 Les malheurs de Milou, (Ticoune, 1987)
 Tintin et le squelette mort, (Ticoune, 1987)

References

External links
http://www.drawnandquarterly.com/artStudio.php?artist=a458321fe403c6 Luc Giard on Drawn & Quarterly

Canadian comics artists
Canadian comics writers
Underground cartoonists
Canadian graphic novelists
Living people
Quebec comics
1956 births